Ramalho is a Portuguese surname. Ramalho may refer to:

People
João Ramalho (1493–1580), Portuguese explorer
Ramalho Ortigão (1836–1915), Portuguese writer
Rosa Ramalho (1888–1977), Portuguese ceramist
José Ramalho (rower) (1901–?unknown), Brazilian rower
José Mauro Ramalho (1925–2019), Brazilian bishop
António Ramalho Eanes (born 1935), Portuguese politician
José Ramalho (volleyball) (born 1937), Brazilian volleyball player
Zé Ramalho (born 1949), Brazilian composer
Elba Ramalho (born 1951), Brazilian musician
Eliseu Ramalho (born 1952), Portuguese footballer
João Ramalho (footballer) (born 1954), Portuguese footballer
Muricy Ramalho (born 1955), Brazilian footballer and football manager
José Luiz Aguiar e Ramalho (born 1963), Brazilian handball player
Renato Ramalho (born 1967), Brazilian medley swimmer
Ramalho (footballer, born 1978), Brazilian footballer
Ramalho (footballer, born 1980), Brazilian footballer
Mariana Barbosa Ramalho (born 1987), Brazilian rugby sevens player
André Ramalho (born 1992), Brazilian footballer
Leah-Marie Ramalho (born 1992), Guyanese footballer
Jonás Ramalho (born 1993), Spanish footballer

Places
João Ramalho (municipality), municipality in Brazil
Serra do Ramalho, Bahia, municipality in Brazil
Serra do Ramalho, cave system in Brazil

See also
Ramallo (disambiguation)

Portuguese-language surnames